Chełmek Wołowski  is a village in the administrative district of Gmina Ścinawa, within Lubin County, Lower Silesian Voivodeship, in south-western Poland.

During World War II, in 1940–1941, a Nazi German forced labour camp for Jews was located in the village.

References

Villages in Lubin County